Dr1-associated corepressor is a protein that in humans is encoded by the DRAP1 gene.

Transcriptional repression is a general mechanism for regulating transcriptional initiation in organisms ranging from yeast to humans.  Accurate initiation of transcription from eukaryotic protein-encoding genes requires the assembly of a large multiprotein complex consisting of RNA polymerase II and general transcription factors such as TFIIA, TFIIB, and TFIID. DR1 is a repressor that interacts with the TATA-binding protein (TBP) of TFIID and prevents the formation of an active transcription complex by precluding the entry of TFIIA and/or TFIIB into the preinitiation complex. The protein encoded by this gene is a corepressor of transcription that interacts with DR1 to enhance DR1-mediated repression. The interaction between this corepressor and DR1 is required for corepressor function and appears to stabilize the TBP-DR1-DNA complex.

Interactions 

DRAP1 has been shown to interact with FOXH1 and DR1.

References

Further reading